State Highway 68 (SH 68) is a State Highway in Kerala, India that starts in Kappad and ends in Adivaram. The highway is 68.11 km long.

The Route Map 
Kappad (Thiruvangoor(NH 66)) - Atholi(SH 38) - Nanminda – Narikkuni – Koduvally – Omassery - Kodencheri - Tusharigiri - Adivaram (Chippilathode(NH 766))

See also 
Roads in Kerala
List of State Highways in Kerala

Narikkuni - Pullaloor- Palath- Kozhikode road is best route from narikkuni to kozhikode

References 

State Highways in Kerala
Roads in Kozhikode district